The Divide is a 2014 legal drama that aired on WE tv. The first season consisted of eight hour-long episodes. It premiered on July 16, 2014. On October 30, 2014, the series was canceled by WE tv.

Plot 
An exploration of morality, ambition, ethics, politics and race in today's justice system as viewed through the eyes of an impassioned case worker and an equally passionate district attorney whose views vary.

Cast 
 Marin Ireland as Christine Rosa
 Paul Schneider as Clark Rylance
 Damon Gupton as Adam Page
 Nia Long as Billie Page
 Clarke Peters as Isaiah Page
 Britne Oldford as Jenny Butler
 Chris Bauer as Jared Bankowski
 Joe Anderson as Terry Kucik
 Adam Rothenberg as Danny
 Kenneth Welsh as Stanley Zale

Development and production 
The series was originally developed and ordered as a pilot in 2012 by sister network AMC, but was not picked up. It was, however, left in contention for a possible pickup at a later date. By the time WE tv had decided to pick up the show, David Manson, who ran the pilot, had moved to Netflix's House of Cards. John Tinker has since stepped in as showrunner.

Episodes

References

External links 

2014 American television series debuts
2014 American television series endings
2010s American drama television series
English-language television shows